Hydnophlebia omnivora is a species of crust fungus in the family Meruliaceae. It causes white rot in various woody angiosperms, being found in arid regions of the Southern United States, northern Mexico, and Uruguay.

Taxonomy
The fungus was first described scientifically in 1925 by American mycologist Cornelius Lott Shear as a species of Hydnum. Kurt Hjortstam and Leif Ryvarden transferred it to the genus Hydnophlebia in 2009. Harold Burdsall and Karen Nakasone proposed a transfer to Phanerochaete, a classification endorsed by MycoBank.

References

Fungi described in 1925
Fungi of the United States
Meruliaceae
Fungi without expected TNC conservation status